Judith Lee Baldwin (born March 26, 1946) is an American film and television actress who replaced Tina Louise in the role of Ginger Grant in Rescue from Gilligan's Island (1978) and The Castaways on Gilligan's Island (1979). A life member of the Actors Studio, Baldwin amassed 46 screen credits between 1969 and her leading role in 2005's Every Secret Thing.

Early life 
Baldwin was born in Washington, D.C. She was crowned Miss New Mexico USA 1965 and was the second runner up to Sue Ann Downey in the Miss USA pageant that year. Her first acting job in Hollywood was in 1969 on I Dream of Jeannie in the episode "Jeannie and the Bachelor Party" playing Major Nelson's secretary Dolores.

Career 
In 1987, she created the role of Beth Logan on the soap opera The Bold and the Beautiful, but she was soon replaced by Nancy Burnett, who became more closely identified in the role.

Baldwin has guest starred on many television series including, Police Story, Fish, Quincy, M.E., The Dukes of Hazzard, The Fall Guy, T. J. Hooker, Hill Street Blues, Fantasy Island, Archie Bunker's Place, CHiPs, Matt Houston, Emerald Point N.A.S., Brothers, Matlock, Freddy's Nightmares, Empty Nest, Tales from the Crypt, Cybill and Six Feet Under.

Television movies and feature films include: The Seven Minutes, The Stepford Wives, Tales of the Apple Dumpling Girl, Hospital Massacre, I Was a Mail Order Bride, Deal of the Century, No Small Affair, Talking Walls, The Stepford Children, Made in U.S.A., Beaches, Pretty Woman, Exit to Eden, James Dean, The Princess Diaries and Every Secret Thing.

Baldwin, who took over the role of Ginger Grant in Rescue from Gilligan's Island in 1978, appeared with the original Ginger (Tina Louise) three years earlier in the 1975 film The Stepford Wives. Besides being in a few scenes together, the last scene in the movie shows both actresses passing in the supermarket and just glancing at one another. Baldwin appeared in the 1987 made-for-TV sequel The Stepford Children with Barbara Eden.

Filmography

Film

Television

References

External links 
 
 
 

1946 births
Living people
Actresses from Washington, D.C.
American film actresses
American television actresses
Miss USA 1960s delegates
20th-century American actresses
21st-century American actresses